Artvin (Laz and) is a city in northeastern Turkey about  inland from the Black Sea. It is the seat of Artvin Province and Artvin District. Its population is 25,841 (2021).

It is located on a hill overlooking the Çoruh River near the Deriner Dam. It is a former bishopric and (vacant) Armenian Catholic titular see and the home of Artvin Çoruh University.

History 
Artifacts dating back to the Bronze Age and even earlier have been found. The area was part of the kingdom of Colchis and part of the Greater Armenia but was always vulnerable to invasions, first the Scythians from across the Caucasus, then the Muslim armies led by Habib, son of Caliph Uthman who controlled the area from 853 AD to 1023 when it was conquered by the Byzantines from the Sac Emirate linked to the Abbasids.

The Principalities of Tao-Klarjeti arose out of the turmoils of the Muslim conquests in the Caucasus in the 7th and 8th centuries, succeeding the early medieval Kingdom of Iberia and latter leading unification of Georgian Kingdom. For a long time the region became a cultural safe-house and one of the most important religious centers of Georgia.

The Seljuk Turks of Alp Arslan conquered the area in 1064 AD; but soon, it was briefly recaptured by the Georgians with the help of the Byzantines. But in 1081 Turkish forces led by Saltukoğlu Beylik managed to take it back with the aid of Melikşah. With the collapse of the Seljuks, the Artvin area came under the control of the Ildeniz tribe of the Anatolian Turkish beyliks.

The Kingdom of Georgia regained control over the region through Georgian-Seljuk wars. Taking advantage of Georgia's weakness through Mongol invasions, Turkmens started their incursions into south-western Georgia. The largely Georgian population of the region called on lord of Samtskhe, to assist them against the Turkmens. By the mid-13th century, the Jaqelis realm thus incorporated most of the mountainous areas of north eastern Anatolia. Various Turkish clans fought for control over the area and this continued until the Safavids ultimately took advantage of the infighting and conquered the area in 1502.

The Ottoman Empire under Mehmet II defeated the Empire of Trebizond to bring the eastern Black Sea coast and the mountainous hinterland under their control.  Subsequent expeditions into the mountains by Selim I and Mehmed Han Yusufeli gave them control of a number of castles and thus the whole district. Kara Ahmet Pasha, the vizier of Suleiman I formed the first Livane Sanjak with the name Pert-Eğekte. On 13 July 1551, with İskender Pasha's Ardanuç  castle, the Ottoman control of Artvin was secure. Ahmed III's vizer Hasan Pasha founded the city of Batum in the newly acquired lands of Ajaria and it became the hub of the area.

 This lasted 250 years until the area was ceded to the Russians by the Ottoman Empire following the Russo-Turkish War (1828–1829), and recovered and again ceded at the conclusion of the Russo-Turkish War of 1877-78. Artvin was in a war zone and continuously changing hands between Russia and Turkey with the Treaties of Brest-Litovsk, Moscow and Kars. The conflict and uncertainty between Russia and Turkey in the late 19th century brought terrible suffering to the people of Artvin (Muslim Georgians), with much of the population moving westwards away from the Russian-controlled areas. The town was the administrative center of the Artvin Okrug of the Batum Oblast.

The Russians withdrew from Artvin following the Russian Revolution of 1917; but when the First World War ended with the Ottomans on the losing side, British troops moved into the area in 1918, followed by  Democratic Republic of Georgia. As a result of Red Army invasion of Georgia, Artvin was ceded to newly established Turkey under the Treaty of Kars in 1921.

Above the strategically placed town and road is the fortress, which was once within the medieval Georgian district of Nigali. The site consists of a single circuit wall surrounding the summit of the outcrop, several impressive rooms, an outwork protecting the south entrance, and a large donjon at the west.  There are also embrasures and windows suitable for archers.  In 1983 the fortress was surveyed and three years later an accurate scaled plan and description were published.

Ecclesiastical history 

On 30 April 1850, the papal bulla Universi Dominici gregis from Pius IX established the Armenian Catholic eparchy (Eastern Catholic diocese) of Artvin of the Armenians, with jurisdiction over the extreme northeast of Turkey and in the (Russian) Transcaucasus. It has had only three incumbents:
 Timoteus Astargi (or Astorgi) (30 April 1850 - death 26 March 1851)
 Antonius Halagi (5 May 1859 - resigned 1878)
 Johannes (John) Zakarian (1 October 1878 - death 1888), who was never allowed to take possession of his see by the Czarist Russian Empire, which had taken control of the whole province of Artvin  after the Russo-Turkish War (1877–1878)

In 1890 about 12,000 Armenian Catholics were reported, entrusted to the care of 13 Armenian priests in 2 churches and 5 chapels.

Under an agreement between Russia and the Holy See in 1904, Catholic Armenians throughout the Caucasus and interior Russia were entrusted to an apostolic administrator resident in Tbilisi (Georgia), but the Soviet authorities imprisoned him, and he died some time before 1937. The diocese had already lost most of its faithful in the Armenian genocide at the end of the First World War.
 
The Holy See continued to list the eparchy of Artvin as a vacant residential see until 1971, but in 1972, suppressing it as such, began to list Artvin as the Armenian Catholic titular bishopric of Artvin (Curiate Italian) / Artwin / Artuinen(sis) Armenorum (Latin).

However it never has had a titular incumbent, who should be of the fitting Episcopal (lowest) rank.

Demographics 

In the census of 1897, the town of Artvin was mainly populated by Armenians, part of whom came from the Mush and Van region. However, the district in which the town was located was largely Muslim. Outside of the town, the population in the district numbered 49,049 people, of whom 39,997 (82%) were Turks, 5,458 (11%) Georgian and 3,173 (6%) Armenian.

Places of interest 

 Artvin or Livana (Livane) castle, built in 937

There are a number of Ottoman Empire houses and public buildings, including :
 Salih Bey mosque, built in 1792
 Çarsi mosque, built in the 18th century
 Balcioglu mosque, built in the 18th century
 The fountain of Çelebi Efendi, built in 1783.

The surrounding countryside offers many places for climbing, trekking and rafting.

Events 
Artvin is known for the Caucasus (Kafkas in Turkish) Culture and Arts Festival, a celebration that takes place at the Kafkasör plateau every year. The most famous event is the bull wrestling which draws many local and international visitors.

Climate 
Artvin, unlike most of the coastal Black Sea Region of Turkey, has a Warm-summer Mediterranean climate (Csb) under the Köppen classification, bordering very closely on an Oceanic climate (Cfb), with the wettest winter month, December, having nearly 3 times the amount of precipitation as the driest summer month, August, which is the prime classifier for a dry-summer climate in the Köppen system. It has a warm summer oceanic climate (Dob) according to the Trewartha classification system.

Twin cities 

  Akhaltsikhe, Georgia
  Oslo, Norway
  Batumi, Georgia
  Frankfurt, Germany
  Casablanca, Morocco

See also 
 Arifana
 Cerattepe
 Lazistan

References

Sources and external links

 Governor's Office
 the Municipality
 GCatholic - former & titular see
 Joseph Lins, "Artvin" in The Catholic Encyclopedia lemma 'Artvin' in Catholic Encyclopedia (New York 1907)
 Artvin Village 
 Photographic survey and plan of Artvin Castle
 local information 
 Artvin Weather Forecast Information
 Artvin Otelleri
 Karadeniz Ansiklopedik Sözlük.İstanbul. 2005. .
 Bibliography - ecclesiastical
 Pius Bonifacius Gams, Series episcoporum Ecclesiae Catholicae, Leipzig 1931, p. 456 & Series episcoporum Ecclesiae Catholicae, Complementi, Leipzig 1931, p. 93
 Notizie storiche sull'eparchia di Artvin, katolsk.no.
 Papal Bulla 'Universi Dominici gregis', in Giovanni Domenico Mansi, Sacrorum Conciliorum Nova et Amplissima Collectio, vol. XL, coll. 779-780

 
Populated places in Artvin Province
Artvin District
Towns in Turkey
Batum Oblast
Eastern Catholic titular sees
Catholic titular sees in Asia
Former Eastern Catholic dioceses